Marcelo Baron Polanczyk (born 19 January 1974), known as just Baron, is a former Brazilian football player.

Club statistics

Honors

Club 
Sampaio Corrêa Futebol Clube
 Campeonato Brasileiro Série C: 1997
 Campeonato Maranhense: 1997
Shimizu S-Pulse
 Emperor's Cup: 2001
 Japanese Super Cup: 2001, 2002

Individual 
 Campeonato Brasileiro Série C Top goalscorer: 1997

References

External links
 Avispa Fukuoka news release
 Marcelo Baron Polanczyk at TheFinalBall.com
 Marcelo Baron Polanczyk at J.League (in Japanese)

1974 births
Living people
Brazilian footballers
Brazilian expatriate footballers
Expatriate footballers in Japan
J1 League players
J2 League players
Japan Football League (1992–1998) players
Ventforet Kofu players
JEF United Chiba players
Shimizu S-Pulse players
Cerezo Osaka players
Kashima Antlers players
Vegalta Sendai players
Vissel Kobe players
Avispa Fukuoka players
Sport Club Internacional players
Associação Chapecoense de Futebol players
Santa Cruz Futebol Clube players
América Futebol Clube (SP) players

Association football forwards